Bernardo Gómez-Pimienta (born August 18, 1961) is Mexican architect and furniture designer. His most notable projects include the National Theatre School-CNA, the Hotel Habita, the renovation of Teatro de los Insurgentes, Building Services Televisa in Chapultepec, Phoenix Fire Station, the Convention and Exhibition Center and the sports complex JVC Educare in Guadalajara, Jalisco.

Early life, education, career
Gómez-Pimienta was born in Belgium and has been an architect since 1987. He is the director of the School of Architecture at the Universidad Anahuac del Norte and member of the National Academy of Architecture and the National System of Creators of CONACULTA.

He was the founding partner and co-director of TEN Arquitectos from 1987-2003, and then founded BGP brand architecture.

Awards and recognitions
Gómez-Pimienta has been decorated as a Knight of the Legion of Honor by the French Republic, appointed Honorary Member of the AIA, HonFAIA ( American Institute of Architects ) and is an Honorary Member of the RAIC, HonRAIC (Royal Architectural Institute of Canada).
 
He was awarded the first "Mies Van der Rohe Latin America" award in 1998.

In 2008, the American Institute of Architects only named 13 Honorary Fellows from around the globe, and Gómez-Pimienta was one of them.

References 

Living people
Mexican architects
1961 births